The 1st KZN Entertainment Awards were held at Durban ICC, KwaZulu-Natal, South Africa on December 15, 2020, were hosted  by Somizi Mhlongo  and Pearl Thusi, aired live on BET Africa.

Winners and nominees
Below list is nominees  and winners. Winners are listed first, highlighted in boldface, and indicated with a double dagger.

Presenters and Performers

Presenters

Performers

Controversy
In April 2021, it was announced  that  the organizers failed to pay the artist their prizes.

References

Awards  established in 2020